Lee E. Payne is a retired United States Air Force major general who last served as the Assistant Director for Combat Support of the Defense Health Agency. He was previously the Command Surgeon of the Air Mobility Command.

References

External links

Year of birth missing (living people)
Living people
Place of birth missing (living people)
United States Air Force generals